Osimo is a town and comune of the Marche region of Italy, in the province of Ancona. , Osimo had a total population of 35,037.

History
Vetus Auximum was founded by the same Greek colonists of Ancona; later it was contested by the Gauls and the Picentes until conquered by the Romans, who used it as a fortress for their northern Picenum settlement starting from 174 BCE. The walls were made of large rectangular stones which are still visible in some locations. It was a colony until 157 BCE. The family of Pompey were its protectors and resisted Julius Caesar in 49 BCE. Inscriptions and monuments in its town square attest to the importance of Osimo during imperial times.

In the 6th century it was besieged twice in the course of the Gothic War (535–554) by Belisarius and Totila; the Byzantine historian Procopius said it was the leading town of Picenum.

Osimo was a free commune by 1100 A.D. It was later returned to the Pope by Cardinal Gil de Albornoz. In 1399–1430, it was a fief of the Malatesta family, who built a rocca, or "castle", which is no longer intact. Osimo was again made a part of the Papal States, and remained so until Italian unification in 1861.

Main sights

Osimo retains a portion of its ancient town wall (2nd century BCE). Under the town is a large series of tunnels with esoteric bas-reliefs. The town hall contains a number of statues found on the site of the ancient forum. The new castle (1489), of which parts remain today, was built by Baccio Pontelli.

Among the churches in the town are the following:

Osimo Cathedral: (8th–12th centuries) The restored Romanesque-Gothic church has a portal with sculptures of the 13th century, an old crypt, a fine bronze font of the 16th century and a series of portraits of all the bishops of the old diocese of Osimo. The baptistery is from the early 17th century and also has a notable baptismal font.
Basilica of San Giuseppe da Copertino: was founded as a church dedicated to St Francis, but with the canonization in 1753 of Joseph of Cupertino, the church was rededicated and refurbished to house his relics.
San Marco Evangelista: Erected in 14th century by Augustinian order; refurbished in later centuries, contains an altarpiece by Guercino.
San Niccolò: 16th-century church
Sanctuary of the Beata Vergine Addolorata: 20th century Neo-Romanesque church outside of the town center

People
 Andrea Cionna (born in 1968), holder of the world record for the fastest marathon run by a totally blind man.
 Bonfilius (1040-1115), monk, bishop and saint
 Bruno Giacconi (1889–1957), Olympian
 Clemente da Osimo (1235–1291), Italian Roman Catholic professed religious
 Luigi Fagioli (1898–1952), motor racing driver
 Sylvester Gozzolini, founder of the Sylvestrines and saint

Twin towns
 Copertino, Italy
 Armstrong, Argentina

See also
Treaty of Osimo
Roman Catholic Archdiocese of Ancona-Osimo

Notes

References

Bibliography 
 

 
Cities and towns in the Marche